Lysogorsky is a rural locality (a khutor) in Bubnovskoye Rural Settlement, Uryupinsky District, Volgograd Oblast, Russia. The population was 90 as of 2010. There are 2 streets.

Geography 
Lysogorsky is located on the right bank of the Khopyor River, 30 km northwest of Uryupinsk (the district's administrative centre) by road. Mikhaylovskaya is the nearest rural locality.

References 

Rural localities in Uryupinsky District